MCB or mcb may refer to:

Science and technology
 Molecular and Cellular Biology, a scientific journal
 Monochlorobenzene, an organic solvent
 Miniature circuit breaker, in electrical distribution boards
 Manually Controlled Barriers, a type of  level crossing in the UK

Organisations
 Mauritius Commercial Bank, the oldest and largest banking institution in Mauritius
 MCB Group, a financial services holding company based in Mauritius, Mauritius Commercial Bank's holding company
 Muslim Commercial Bank, former name of MCB Bank Limited, a network of banks in Pakistan
 Maidenhead Citadel Band, of The Salvation Army
 Methodist College Belfast, a voluntary grammar school in Belfast, Northern Ireland
 Muslim Council of Britain, an umbrella body for 500 mosques, schools and associations in Britain
 Movimiento Continental Bolivariano, Spanish name of the Bolivarian Continental Movement, a left-wing political movement in Latin America

Transport
 McComb (Amtrak station) (Amtrak station code), Mississippi, US
 Moulsecoomb railway station, a railway station in Sussex, England

Other uses
 Janney coupler or Master Car Builders coupler, a type railroad coupling
 MCB Tower, a skyscraper in Pakistan, owned by MCB Bank Limited

See also
 United States Marine Corps Bases:
 Marine Corps Base Quantico
 Marine Corps Base Camp Pendleton